This is a list of Arab scientists and scholars from the Muslim World, including Al-Andalus (Spain), who lived from antiquity up until the beginning of the modern age, consisting primarily of scholars during the Middle Ages. For a list of contemporary Arab scientists and engineers see List of modern Arab scientists and engineers

Both the Arabic and Latin names are given. The following Arabic naming articles are not used for indexing:

Al - the
 Ibn, bin, banu - son of
 abu, abi - father of, the one with

A 
Ali (601, Mecca – 661, Kufa ), Arabic grammarian, rhetoric, theologian, exegesis and mystic
Aisha (613, Mecca – 678, Medina), Islamic scholar, hadith narrator, her intellect and knowledge in various subjects, including poetry and medicine.
Abbas Ibn Firnas, astronomer, mathematician, physicist, inventor
Aisha al-Bauniyya (1402–1475), an Arab woman  Sufi master and poet
Avempace (1085, Zaragoza – 1138, Fez), philosopher, astronomer, physician
Ammar al-Mawsili (10th century, b. Mosul), ophthalmologist and physician
Ali al-Uraidhi (7th century, b. Medina), Muslim scholar
 Ali ibn Isa al-Kahhal (fl. 1010), physician and ophthalmologist
Ali al-Hadi (829, Medina – 868, Samarra), Islamic scholar
Ali ibn al-Madini (778, Basra – 849, Samarra), Islamic scholar and traditionalist
 Ali ibn Ridwan (988, Giza – 1061, Baghdad), astronomer and geometer with Khalid Ben Abdulmelik
Ali al-Ridha (765, Medina – 818, Tus), Islamic scholar and theologian
Ahmad ibn Hanbal (780, Baghdad – 855, Baghdad), theologian, ascetic, and hadith traditionist
Ahmad al-Muhajir (873, Basra – 956, Al-Husaisa), scholar and teacher
Ahmad ibn Yusuf (835, Baghdad – 912, Cairo), mathematician
Ahmad ibn Abi Bakr al-Zuhri (767, Medina – 856), Maliki jurist
Apollodorus of Damascus (50, Damascus – 130), architect, engineer, and designer
Abd al-Salam ibn Mashish al-Alami (1140, Jabal Alam – 1227, Jabal Alam), religious scholar of Sufism
Abdullah ibn Umar (610, Mecca – 693, Mecca), Islamic scholar and hadith narrator
Abd Allah al-Qaysi (d. 885, b. Spain), Muslim jurist and theologian
Abd-Allah ibn Ibadh (d. 708, b. Basra), hadith narrator and theologian
Abd al-Hamid al-Katib (d. 756), founder of Arabic prose
Ibn Abbas (619, Mecca – 687, Ta'if), jurist and theologian
Abdullah ibn Alawi al-Haddad (1634, Tarim – 1720, Tarim), Sufi saint and jurist
Abd al-Ghani al-Maqdisi (1146, Jamma'in – 1203), Islamic scholar and a prominent hadith master
Abd al-Aziz Yemeni Tamimi (816, Yemen – 944, Yemen), Sufi saint and scholar
Abu al-Fazal Yemeni Tamimi (842, Hejaz – 1034, Baghdad), Sufi saint and mystic
Abu al-Aswad al-Du'ali (603–689, Basra), grammarian
Abu al-Hasan al-Ash'ari (874, Basra – 936, Baghdad), philosopher, Shafi'i scholar and theologian
Abu Jafar al-Ghafiqi (d. 1165), an Arab botanist, pharmacologist, physician and scholar 
Abu Bakr ibn al-Arabi (1076, Seville – 1148), Islamic scholar and judge of Maliki law
Abū Kāmil Shujāʿ ibn Aslam (850–930), mathematician
Abu 'Amr ibn al-'Ala' (689, Mecca – 770, Kufa) linguists and grammarian
Abu Bakr al-Aydarus (1447, Tarim – 1508, Aden), religious scholar of Sufism 
 Abu Ishaq Ibrahim al-Zarqali (1029–1100), was an Arab maker of astronomical instruments and an astrologer
 Al-Ashraf Umar II (1242, Yemen – 1296, Yemen), astronomer and ruler of Yemen
Al-Akhfash al-Akbar (d. 793, b. Basra), Arab grammarian
Al-Awza'i (707, Baalbek – 774, Beirut), jurist and theologian
Al-Asma'i (739, Basra – 831, Basra), pioneer of zoology, botany and animal husbandry
Ibn Abi Asim (821, Basra – 900, Isfahan), scholar, famous or his work in the hadith science
Ibn al-'Awwam (12th century, b. Seville), agriculturist and botanist
Ibn al-Adim (1192, Aleppo – 1262, Egypt), biographer and historian
Ibn al-A'lam (d. 985, Baghdad), astronomer and astrologer
Ibn al-Athir (1160, Cizre – 1233, Mosul), historian and biographer
Ibn al-Abbar (1199, Valencia – 1260, Tunis), historian, poet, diplomat, theologian and scholar
Ibn al-Akfani (1286, Sinjar – 1348, Cairo), Arab encyclopedist and physician
Ibn 'Adlan (1187, Mosul – 1268, Cairo), cryptographer and poet
Ibn Arabi (1165, Murcia – 1240, Damascus), Islamic scholar and philosopher
Ibn Arabshah (1389, Damascus – 1450, Egypt), writer and traveller

B 
 Bahāʾ al-dīn al-ʿĀmilī (1547, Baalbek – 1621, Isfahan), philosopher, architect, mathematician, astronomer
 Bahlool (d. 807, b. Baghdad), judge and scholar
 Abu Mansur al-Baghdadi (980, Baghdad – 1037, Esfarayen), mathematician
 Abd al-Latif al-Baghdadi (1162, Baghdad – 1231, Baghdad), physician, historian, Egyptologist and traveler
 Al-Baqillani (d. 1013, b. Basra), theologian, scholar, and Maliki lawyer
 Al-Battani (850, Harran – 929, Samarra), astronomer and mathematician
 Al-Baladhuri (820, Baghdad – 892, Baghdad), historian
 Al-Buni (d. 1225), writer and mathematician
 Al-Bakri (1014, Huelva – 1094, Cordoba), geographer and historian
 Al-Baji (1156, Beja – 1231, Sidi Bou Said), Sufi mystic and scholar
 Ibn al-Banna' al-Marrakushi (1256, Marrakesh – 1321), mathematician, astronomer, Islamic scholar, Sufi, and astrologer
 Ibn al-Baitar (1197, Malaga – 1248, Damascus), pharmacist, botanist, physician
 Ibn Bassal (b. 1085, Toledo), botanist and agronomist
 Ibn Bassam (1058, Santarem – 1147), poet and historian
 Ibn Butlan (1038, Baghdad – 1075), Arab Christian physician

C 

 Cosmas (d. 287, Yumurtalik), Arab physician and saint
 Calid (d. 704, Homs), Umayyad prince and alchemist
 Callinicus (3rd century), historian, orator, rhetorician and sophist

D 
Damian (d. 287, Yumurtalik), Arab physician and saint
Dawud al-Antaki (b. Idlib – d. 1599, Mecca), physician and pharmacist
Dawud Tai (1344–1405), Islamic scholar and Sufi mystic
Diya al-Din al-Maqdisi (918, Damascus – 995), Hanbali Islamic scholar
Al-Damiri (1344, Cairo – 1405, Cairo), zoologist
 Al-Dakhwar (1170, Damascus – 1230), physician
 Al-Darimi (797, Samarkand – 869, Muscat), Islamic scholar and muhaddith
 Al-Dimashqi (1256, Damascus – 1327, Safed), geographer
 Al-Dimashqi, Abu al-Fadl (12th-century), writer and economist
Ibn al-Durayhim (1312–1359/62), cryptologist
Ibn Dihya (1150, Valencia – 1235, Cairo), scholar of  Arabic language and Islamic studies
Ibn Duraid (837, Basra – 934, Baghdad), geographer, genealogist, poet, and philologist
Ibn Daqiq al-'Id (1228, Yanbu – 1302), one of Islam's great scholars in the fundamentals of Islamic law and belief, and was an authority in the Shafi'i legal school

F 
 Fatima al-Fihri (800, Kairouan – 880), science patron and founder of the Al Quaraouiyine mosque
Fatima bint Musa (790–816), theologian and saint
Al-Farahidi (c. 718 – 791), writer and philologist, compiled the first dictionary of the Arabic language, the Kitab al-Ayn
Al-Fasi, Abu al-Mahasin (1530–1604), Sufi saint
Al-Farghani (d. 880), astronomer, known in Latin as Alfraganus
 Ibn al-Furat (1334–1405), historian
Ibn al-Farid (c. 1181 – 1234), Arabic poet, writer, and philosopher
Ibn Fadlan (10th century), writer, traveler, member of an embassy of the Caliph of Baghdad to the Volga Bulgars

G 
Genethlius (3rd century), sophist and rhetorician from Petra
Al-Ghafiqi (d. 1165), 12th-century oculist
Al-Ghassani (1548–1610), physician

H 
 Haly Abenragel (d. 1037), astrologer, best known for his Kitāb al-bāri' fi ahkām an-nujūm
Harbi al-Himyari (8th century), alchemist
Hasan al-Rammah (d. 1295), chemist and engineer
Hamdallah Mustawfi (1281–1349), geographer
Hunayn ibn Ishaq (809–873), Arab Christian scholar, physician, and scientist
Heliodorus (3rd century), sophist of Arab origin
Hisham ibn al-Kalbi (d. 819), historian
Hafsa bint Sirin (651–719), scholar of Islam
Harun ibn Musa (d. 786), scholar of the Arabic language and Islamic studies.
Harith al-Muhasibi (781–857), philosopher, theologian and Sufi scholar
Abu'l-Hasan al-Bayhaqi (1097–1169), astronomer and historian
Abu'l Abbas al-Hijazi (12th century), traveler, merchant and sailor
Abul Hasan Hankari (1018–1093), philosopher, theologian and jurist
Al-Hamdani (893–945), geographer, historian and astronomer
Al-Humaydī al-Azdi (1029–1095), historian
Al-Harith ibn Kalada (d. 634–35), physician
Al-Hilli (1250–1325), Twelver Shia theologian
Ibn 'Abd al-Hakam (803–871), Egyptian historian
Ibn al-Haj (1250–1336), scholar and theologian writer
Ibn al-Haytham (965–1040), physicist and mathematician
 Ibn Hawqal (943–969), writer, geographer, and chronicler
 Ibn Hubal (1122–1213), physician, scientist and author of a medical compendium
 Ibn Hisham (d. 835), historian and biographer
Ibn Hajar al-Haytami (1503–1566), jurist and theologian

I 
 Ibrāhīm al-Fazārī (d. 777), mathematician and astronomer 
Ibrahim al-Nakha'i (670–717), theologian, Islamic scholar
Ibrahim al-Nazzam (c. 775 – c. 845), Mu'tazilite theologian and poet
Iamblichus (c. 245 – c. 325), Neoplatonist philosopher, mystic and philosopher
Iamblichus (c. 165 – 180), novelist and rhetorician
Ismail Qureshi al Hashmi (1260–1349), Sufi scholar
Ismail al-Jazari (1136–1206), scholar, inventor, mechanical engineer, artisan, artist 
Ibrahim ibn Adham (718–782), ascetic Sufi saint
Ismail ibn al-Ahmar (1324–1407), historian
Ishaq ibn Hunayn (c. 830 – c. 910/1), physician and translator
Izz al-Din ibn 'Abd al-Salam (1181–1262), theologian and jurist
 Al-Idrisi (1099–1166), geographer and cartographer
 Al-ʻIjliyyah, (10th-century), female maker of astrolabes
 Ibn Abi Ishaq (d. 735), earliest known grammarian of the Arabic language
 Ibn Ishaq (704–761), historian and hagiographer

J
Ja'far al-Sadiq (702–765), theologian and alchemist
Jabir ibn Aflah (1100–1150), astronomer and mathematician who invented torquetum
 Jabir ibn Hayyan (died c. 806–816), alchemist and polymath, pioneer of organic chemistry; may also have been Persian
Jābir ibn Zayd (8th century), theologian and jurist
Al-Jawaliqi (1074–1144), grammarian and philologist
 Al-Jahiz (776–869), historian, biologist and author
Al-Jayyānī (989–1079), mathematician and author
 Al-Jawbari (fl. 1222), alchemist and writer
 Al-Jabali (d. 976), physician and mathematician from Al-Andalus
 Al-Jubba'i (d. 915), Mu'tazili theologian and philosopher
Al-Jazari (1136–1206), inventor, engineer, artisan, mathematician
Al-Jarmi (d. 840), grammarian of Arabic Language
Ibn al-Jazzar (10th century), influential 10th-century physician and author
Ibn al-Jawzi (1116–1201), heresiographer, historian, hagiographer and philologist
Ibn Juzayy (d. 1357), historian, scholar and writer of poetry
Ibn Juljul (c. 944–c. 994), physician and pharmacologist
 Ibn Jazla (11th century), physician and author of influential treatise on regimen
Ibn Jubayr (1145–1217), geographer, traveller and poet, known for his detailed travel journals

K 
Khalifah ibn Khayyat (777–854), Arab historian
 Al-Khalili (1320–1380), astronomer who compiled extensive tables for astronomical use
 Al-Khatib al-Baghdadi (1002–1071), Islamic scholar and historian
 Al-Khayyat (c. 770–c. 835), astrologer and a student of Mashallah
 Al-Kindi (c. 801–873), Arab philosopher, mathematician, astronomer, physician and geographer
Ibn al-Khabbaza (d. 1239), historian and poet
Ibn al-Kammad (d. 1195), astronomer
Ibn al-Kattani (951–1029), scholar, philosopher, physician, astrologer, man of letters, and poet
Ali ibn Khalaf (11th century), astronomer
Ibn al-Khatib (1313–1374), polymath, poet, writer, historian, philosopher, physician
Ibn Kathir (c. 1300–1373), influential Sunni scholar and historian
Ibn Khaldun (1332–1406), historian, sociologist, and philosopher

L 

 Al-Laqani (d. 1631), mufti of Maliki law, a scholar of Hadith, a scholar of theology and author of one of the didactic poems on Ash'ari theology
Al-Lakhmi (1006–1085), jurist in the Maliki school

M 
 Malik ibn Anas (711–795), theologian, and hadith traditionist
 Maslama al-Majriti (950–1007), astronomer, chemist, mathematician, economist
Moulay Brahim (d. 1661 CE), Sufi saint
Mujir al-Din (1456–1522), qadi and historian
Mohammed al-Mahdi al-Fasi (1624–1698), mystic, biographer and historian
Mohammed al-Arbi al-Fasi (1580–1642), author
Mohammed ibn Qasim al-Tamimi (1140–1207), hadith scholar and biographer
Mohammed ibn Nasir (1603–1674), theologian, scholar and physician
Makhdoom Ali Mahimi (1372–1431), Muslim scholar and saint
Muslim ibn al-Hajjaj (815–875), Islamic scholar, theologian and famous hadith compiler
Mujahid ibn Jabr (645–722), Islamic scholar and jurist
Mohammed ibn al-Tayyib (1698–1756), linguist, historian and scholar of fikh and hadith
Muḥammad ibn Ibrāhīm al-Fazārī (d. 796 or 806), Muslim philosopher, mathematician and astronomer
Muhammad al-Baghdadi (d. 1037), mathematician
Muhammad ibn Aslam Al-Ghafiqi (d.1165), an Arab doctor, ophthalmologist and pharmacist
Muhammad Ibn Wasi' Al-Azdi (d. 751), Islamic scholar of hadith, judge and soldier
Muhammad al-Shaybani (749/50 – 805), father of Muslim international law
Muhammed ibn Umail al-Tamimi (900–960), Arab alchemist
Abu al-Majd ibn Abi al-Hakam (d. 1174), physician, musician and astrologer
Abu Mikhnaf (d. 774), historian
Abu Madyan (1126–1198), influential Andalusian mystic and a Sufi master
Al-Masudi (896–956), historian, geographer and philosopher, traveled to Spain, Russia, India, Sri Lanka and China, spent his last years in Syria and Egypt
Al-Maʿarri (973–1057), blind Arab philosopher, poet and writer
Al-Maqrizi (1364–1442), historian
Al-Maqdisi (946–991), medieval Arab geographer, author of Ahsan at-Taqasim fi Ma`rifat il-Aqalim (The Best Divisions for Knowledge of the Regions)
Al-Maziri (1061–1141 CE), jurist in the Maliki school
Al-Mubarrad (826–898), grammarian and linguist
Al-Mubashshir ibn Fatik (11th century), mathematician
Al-Musabbihi (977–1030), Fatimid historian
Ibn Khalaf al-Muradi (11th century) mechanical engineer and inventor
 Ibn al-Majdi (1359–1447), mathematician and astronomer
 Ibn Manzur (1233–1312), lexicographer and linguist
Ibn Malik (1203/1204 or 1204/1025 – 21 February 1274) grammarian
Ibn Mājid (1432–1500), navigator and poet
Ibn Maḍāʾ (1116–1196), mathematician and grammarian

N 
Niftawayh (858–935), grammarian
 Nur ad-Din al-Bitruji (d. 1204), astronomer and philosopher; the Alpetragius crater on the Moon is named after him
Nadr ibn al-Harith (d. 624 CE), physician and practitioner
Nafi ibn al-Harith (d. 13 AH/634–35), physician
Abu Jaʿfar an-Nahhas (d. 338), grammarian
Al-Nawawi (1234–1277), hadith scholar
 Al-Nuwayri (1279–1333), historian and encyclopedist
Ibn al-Nafis (1213–1288), physician and author, the first to describe pulmonary circulation, compiled a medical encyclopedia and wrote numerous works on other subjects
Ibn al-Nadim (d. 995), bibliophile of Baghdad and compiler of the Arabic encyclopedic catalogue known as 'Kitāb al-Fihrist'

Q 
Qadi Ayyad (1083–1149), biographer and historian
Qatāda ibn Di'āma (d. 735/736), traditionalist, hadith, tafsir, Arabic poetry and genealogy
Qasim ibn Muhammad ibn Abi Bakr (660/62–728/30), Islamic scholar
Abū al-Ḥasan al-Qalaṣādī (1412–1486), mathematician from Al-Andalus specializing in Islamic inheritance jurisprudence
Al-Qabisi (d. 967), astrologer and mathematician
 Al-Qadi al-Nu'man (d. 974), official historian of the Fatimid caliphs
Al-Qalqashandi (1355/56–1418), writer and mathematician
Al-Qushayri (986–1074), theologian and philosopher
Al-Qastallani (1448–1517), jurist and theologian
 Al-Qifti (1172–1248), historian
 Al-Qurtubi (1233–1286), muhaddith and faqih
 Ibn al-Qūṭiyya (d. 977), Andalusian historian
 Ibn al-Quff (1233–1286), physician
Ibn al-Qasim (750–806), jurist in the Maliki school
Ibn al-Qalanisi (c. 1071–1160), chronicler and historian
Ibn Qayyim al-Jawziyya (1292–1350), theologian, and spiritual writer
Ibn Qudamah (1147–1223), theologian

R 
 Rabia of Basra (714–801), philosopher and Sufi mystic
Rashidun al-Suri (1177–1241), physician and botanist
Raja ibn Haywah (7th century), architect, jurist and Arabic calligraphist
Rufaida Al-Aslamia (b. 620), physician
Al-Ruhawi (9th century), physician
Ibn Abi Ramtha (7th century), physician
Ibn al‐Raqqam (1250–1315), astronomer, mathematician and physician
 Ibn Rajab (1335–1392/93), Islamic scholar

S 

Sahnun (776–854), Islamic scholar and Maliki jurist
Said al-Andalusi (1029–1070), astronomer, historian and philosopher
Said ibn al-Musayyib (642–715 CE), jurist and theologian
Sa'id ibn Aws al-Ansari (d. 830), linguist
Shihab al-Umari (1300–1349), historian
Sayf ibn Umar (1428–1497), historian
Sufyan al-Thawri (716–778), Islamic scholar and jurist
Sa'id ibn Jubayr (665–714), theologian and jurist
Sufyan ibn `Uyaynah (725–814), religious scholar and theologian
Sidi Mahrez (951–1022), scholar, jurist and Qadi
Sibt al-Maridini (1423–1506), astronomer and mathematician
Sitt al-Wuzara al-Tanukhiyyah (1226/1226-1338), an Arab woman scholar
Sulaiman al-Mahri (1480–1550), geographer
Abu al-Salt (c. 1068–1134), astronomer, physician and alchemist
Abu Amr al-Shaybani ((d. 821/28), lexicographer and collector of Arabic poetry
Abu Saeed Mubarak Makhzoomi (1013–1119), theologian
Al-Shafi‘i (767–820 CE), Islamic scholar
Al-Sakhawi (1428–1497), hadith scholar and historian
Al-Shaykh Al-Mufid (c. 948–1022 CE), Twelver Shia theologian
Abu Ishaq al-Shatibi (1320–1388), Islamic legal scholar
Al-Suwaydi (1204–1292), physician
Al-Shifa' bint Abdullah (7th century), healer, wise woman and practiced folk-medicine
Al-Sayyid al-Tanukhi (951–1022), Druze theologian and commentator
Al-Suhayli (1114–1185), grammarian and scholar of law.
Al-Ṣaidanānī (10th century), astronomer
Ibn al-Shatir (1304–1375), astronomer, mathematician, engineer and inventor, worked at the Umayyad Mosque in Damascus, Syria, developed an original astronomical model
Ibn al-Saffar (d. 1035), astronomer
Ibn al-Samh (979–1035), mathematician and astronomer
 Ibn Sa'id al-Maghribi (1213–1286), geographer
 Ibn Sab'in (d. 1271), last philosopher of the Andalus
Ibn Sidah (c.1007–1066), grammarian and lexicographer
Ibn Sirin (d. 729), mystic, psychologist and interpreter of dreams
Ibn Sa'd (784–845), scholar and Arabian biographer
 Ibn Shihab al-Zuhri (670–741), historian 
Ibn Sayyid al-Nās, Abu Bakr (1200–1261), Medieval theologian
Ibn Sayyid al-Nās, Fath al-Din (1272–1334), Medieval theologian

T 
Taqi al-Din Muhammad ibn Ma'ruf (1526–1585), physician, mathematician, clockmaker and astronomer
Taqi al-Din al-Subki (1284 CE–1355 CE), scholar, jurist and judge
Taj al-Din al-Subki (1327/28–1370), historian and jurist
Taqi al-Din Muhammad al-Fasi (1373–1429),  historian, scholar, hafith, faqih and Maliki qadi
Taqiyya Umm Ali bint Ghaith ibn Ali al-Armanazi (1111-1183), an Arab woman poet and scholar
Theodore Abu Qurrah (750–825), theologian and bishop
Thābit ibn Qurra (826–902), mathematician, physician, astronomer, and translator
Al-Tabarani (873–970), Islamic scholar
Al-Tughrai (c. 1061–1122), physician and alchemist
Al-Tahawi (843–933), jurist and a hadith scholar
Al-Tighnari (1073–1118), agronomist, botanist, biologist
Al-Tamimi (10th-century), physician from Palestine
Al-Tawhīdī (923–1023), philosopher and thinker
Ibn Taymiyyah (d. 1328), theologian and logician
Ibn al-Tiqtaqa (d. 1310), historian
Ibn Tawus (1193–1266), astrologer
Ibn Tufail (1105–1185), Andalusian writer, novelist, Islamic philosopher, Islamic theologian, physician, astronomer, vizier, and court official
Ibn al-Thahabi (d. 1033), physician and author of the first known alphabetical encyclopedia of medicine

U 

 Usama ibn Munqidh (1095–1188), Arab historian, politician, and diplomat
Urwah ibn Zubayr (7th century), historian and jurist
Umm al-Darda  (7th century), jurist and theologian
Umm Darda al-Sughra (7th century), jurist and scholar of Islam
Umm Farwah (8th century), hadith narrator and saint
Al-Uqlidisi (920–980), wrote two works on arithmetic, may have anticipated the invention of decimals
Al-Urḍī (d. 1266), astronomer
Ibn Abi Usaibia (1203–1270), physician and historian, wrote Uyun al-Anba fi Tabaqat al-Atibba (Lives of the Physicians)
Ibn Uthal (7th century), physician
Ibn Umail, (10th century), alchemist and mystic

W 
 Waddah al-Yaman (d. 709), poet, famous for his erotic and romantic poems
Wasil ibn Ata (700–748), theologian and founder of the Mutazilite school of Islamic thought
Al-Warraq (889–994), scholar and critic of religions
Al-Wafa'i (1408–1471), astronomer
 Ibn al-Wafid (997–1074), pharmacologist and physician 
 Ibn al-Wardi (1292–1342), historian
Ibn Wahb (743–813 CE), jurist of Maliki school
Ibn Wahshiyya (10th century), Arab alchemist and agriculturalist

Y 

Yahya ibn Aktham (d. 857), jurist
Yaʿīsh al-Umawī (1400–1489), mathematician, wrote works on mensuration and arithmetic
Yusuf al-Mu'taman ibn Hud (11th century), mathematician
Abu Yusuf (735–798), Islamic scholar
Ibn Yunus (c. 950–1009), mathematician and astronomer

Z 
Zayn al-Din al-Amidi (d. 1312 AD), Islamic scholar and inventor
Zaynab bint al-Kamal (1248–1339), Arab woman scholar 
Zethos (3rd-century), neoplatonist and disciple of Plotinus
Zakariya al-Qazwini (d. 1283), physician, astronomer, geographer, and proto-science fiction writer
Zakariyya al-Ansari (c. 1420–1520), Islamic scholar and mystic
Zayn al-Abidin (659–713), Muslim scholar and Twelver Imam
Al-Zahrawi (936–1013), Islam's greatest medieval surgeon, wrote comprehensive medical texts combining Middle-Eastern, Indian and Greco-Roman classical teachings, shaped European surgical procedures until the Renaissance, considered the "father of surgery", wrote Al-Tasrif, a thirty-volume collection of medical practice
Al-Zubayr ibn Bakkar (788–870), historian and genealogist
Al-Zarqali (1028–1087), mathematician, influential astronomer, and instrument maker, contributed to the famous Tables of Toledo
Ibn Zuhr (1091–1161), prominent physician of the Medieval Islamic period
Ibn Zafar al Siqilli (1104–1172), Arab-Sicilian philosopher and polymath

Notes

See also 
Science in the medieval Islamic world
List of Christian scientists and scholars of the medieval Islamic world
List of scientists in medieval Islamic world
List of modern Arab scientists and engineers
List of pre-modern Iranian scientists and scholars
List of Turkic scholars
List of Arabs

 
Scientists and scholars
Lists of scientists by nationality

Medieval Islamic world-related lists
People of the medieval Islamic world by ethnicity